Sfârcea may refer to several villages in Romania:

 Sfârcea, a village in Întregalde Commune, Alba County
 Sfârcea, a village in Braloștița Commune, Dolj County